Alamance Battleground is a North Carolina State Historic Site commemorating the Battle of Alamance.  The historic site is located south of Burlington, Alamance County, North Carolina in the United States.

History
The Battle of Alamance was fought in May 1771 as part of the War of the Regulation between the forces of Royal Governor William Tryon and a band of settlers from western North Carolina who were dissatisfied with the leadership provided by the royal governors.

Archaeological studies begun in 2009 have also found evidence of a Revolutionary War skirmish that occurred between the Delaware Light Infantry and British General Charles Cornwallis' forces on March 5, 1781, one of several small battles to occur in the area prior to the Battle of Guilford Courthouse.  Evidence was also found of a Civil War era encampment of the 3rd North Carolina Junior Reserve unit under the command of Col. John Hinsdale, who camped on the site shortly before surrendering near High Point to Union forces.

Alamance Battleground State Historic Site
The state historic site belongs to the North Carolina Department of Natural and Cultural Resources was established to preserve part of the battleground and provide historical interpretation of the lifestyle of the settlers in 1770s north central North Carolina. Family papers, books, and documents relate the story of the era, providing authentic examples of living on the frontier during the eighteenth and nineteenth centuries.

Grounds

A visitor center at the site allows visitors to view a film and several historical items - including the powder horn of Harmon Cox, the only known surviving archeological relic from the Battle of Alamance, in a small museum.  Outside the visitors center is a 3-pounder cannon replica and a map of the battleground site.  Outside the visitors center, the grounds are marked with 2 granite monuments.  The smaller monument was given as a memorial in 1880 while the larger monument featuring a statue of James Hunter, the so-called "General of the Regulators", was erected in 1901. The grounds are crossed by a ¾ mile trail, and key battle positions are marked with pennants as is the Regulator campsite. A smokehouse also stands on the grounds.  There is a plaque that commemorates the deaths of the six men who were hanged as traitors by decree of Governor Tryon following the defeat of the Regulators: James Pugh, Robert Matear, Benjamin Merrill, Captain Messer, and two others.

Alamance Battleground State Historic Site also includes the John Allen House, which family sources suggest was constructed around 1780. John's sister, Amy, was the wife of Herman Husband, an agitator and pamphleteer prominent in the Regulator movement who was present at the Battle of Alamance. Donated by descendants of the family and moved from nearby Snow Camp to the current site, the frontier style, one room log home is furnished with restored, original pieces from the period.

Visitors

Guided tours of the Allen House are provided upon request. The visitor center has several exhibits and hosts a twenty-five-minute audio-visual program about the battle, the War of the Regulation and what life was like on the frontier of North Carolina. The battleground is largely handicapped accessible. Ten picnic tables are available for use by visitors. A gift shop is located within the visitor's center.

See also
Battle of Alamance
National Register of Historic Places

References

External links
Alamance Battleground State Historic Site - official site

Military history of the Thirteen Colonies
Pre-statehood history of North Carolina
Houses on the National Register of Historic Places in North Carolina
Historic house museums in North Carolina
Military and war museums in North Carolina
Museums in Alamance County, North Carolina
1771 in the Thirteen Colonies
Protected areas of Alamance County, North Carolina
North Carolina State Historic Sites
Regulator Movement
National Register of Historic Places in Alamance County, North Carolina
Former state parks of North Carolina
Conflict sites on the National Register of Historic Places in North Carolina